Centaurworld is an American animated musical comedy streaming television series created by Megan Nicole Dong, with songs by Dong and Dominic Bisignano.
Produced by Sketchshark Productions and Netflix Animation, it premiered on Netflix on July 30, 2021. A second and final season was released on December 7, 2021.

Synopsis
Centaurworld follows a warhorse who is transported from her embattled world to a strange land inhabited by vibrant, singing centaurs of all species, shapes, and sizes.

Cast and characters

Main
 Kimiko Glenn as Horse, a brave warhorse who is separated from her rider and ends up in the magical dimension called Centaurworld. Horse loses her armour and becomes more cartoonish due to exposure to Centaurworld’s atmosphere, though this causes her to have access to magic. This magic includes the ability to jump into other’s pasts, a skill she later uses to immobilize the Nowhere King’s army.
 Glenn's other voices include a cataur named Madame Jelly who uses a cat piano in the sash competition, the leaftaur baby, and Horsatia, a wealthy horse who Horse masquerades as during her trip to the Horsetaur Kingdom.
 Megan Hilty as Wammawink, a motherly alpaca centaur who lived in Centaur Valley before accompanying Horse on her journey. As a child, she used to reside in the Lost Forest before it was destroyed in a devastating war. She is initially overprotective of her herd and occasionally goes too far in her protection, but deep down she believes her herd can work on their own.
 Hilty's other voices include Shar (one of the Glitter Cats), the leaftaur mom, a catfishtaur, occasional Moletaur backup singing, and the Killer Whaletaur. 
 Sophia Lewis voices Baby Wammawink.
 Parvesh Cheena as Zulius, a flamboyant and effeminate zebra-like centaur who has the power to magically shapeshift his mane. He is shown to have a mysterious past with Splendib, who he sees as his sworn enemy (presumably because Splendib beat him in Johnny Teatime’s Be Best Competition some years prior), but in Season 2 they have become good friends. Zulius also has the ability to slow down time to comment on the current events, which greatly injures everyone around him.
 Cheena also occasionally performs as part of the Moletaur backup singers in songs they're in.
 Chris Diamantopoulos as Ched, a cynical and belligerent finch-like centaur. He harbors a grudge against Horse, but it is revealed that this is because of his trauma related to horsetaurs. In Season 2, it is revealed he was tortured by Malandrew, who sees him as a “ball”. Additionally, he has a great fear of a creature he calls the “dentist”, who allegedly had an affair with his mother during his childhood. His dream is to be a tulip stepper (people in a sport played by horsetaurs, who step around a field of tulips and avoid stepping on them), and his dream is fulfilled when one winks at him in the final episode.
 Diamantopoulos also voices the hyenataur, Pawter, Zimples, Sean-Anemone, the Rutabagataurs (non-singing), Horsatio, (Horsatia’s husband) the Narwhaltaur, Moletaur backup in Holes: Part 3, the Leaftaur King, a gophertaur, and Guskin, the Elktaur’s former boss who is killed by him upon his transformation into the Nowhere King.
 Roman Engel voices Young Ched.
 Megan Nicole Dong as Glendale, a neurotic and kleptomaniacal gerenuk-like centaur who can store an infinite amount of objects in a portal hidden in her stomach. In Season 2, it is revealed that the portal is a near-omnipotent being who has nearly complete sway over Glendale, and that the portal houses a pocket universe, several weapons, tissues, and Gebbery’s coat, among other things.
 Dong also voices Kale (one of the Glitter Cats), occasional Moletaur backup singing, and "Figure 2", a young human female who tries to steal some apples from Rider.
 Isabella Russo voices Young Glendale.
 Josh Radnor as Durpleton, a naive and friendly giraffe-like centaur. He is the gentlest of the herd. He acts erratically, though this is later revealed to be because of being abandoned by his parents as a child. In the Season 1 finale, he adopts Stabby, who initially resists his advances but eventually gives in to their relationship upon transforming into a cartoon due to being in Centaurworld too long. Upon reuniting with his father, he proves he is a better parent due to actually loving Stabby.
 Andy Walken voices Young Durpleton.
 Jessie Mueller as Rider, a human warrior and Horse's best friend tasked with returning a magical artifact to her general to save the world from an invading horde of minotaurs. After reuniting with Horse, the two reluctantly leave each other to pursue their two separate quests, but reunite again to stop the Nowhere King. Eventually, she is stabbed by the General to prevent her from killing the Nowhere King, but survives the attack and moves into Centaurworld, where her hair transforms due to being in Centaurworld too long.
 Mueller's other roles are Pliptoria, the Moosetaur (Laroub) and the Walrustaur (LaCroiv), McCarpy, and a female soldier.

Supporting
 Renée Elise Goldsberry as Waterbaby, a hippopotamus-like centaur and one of the shamans in Centaurworld and mentor to Wammawink. She eventually becomes a spy for the General to help stop the Nowhere King’s forces, and with the help of her ability to transform into a Minotaur and the assistance of Comfortable Doug, she becomes vital in the war.
 Goldsberry also voices the medic in "The Ballad of Becky Apples".
 Tony Hale as Durpletoot, the voice given to Durpleton's flatulence after his wish is granted by the Tree Shamans. The flatulence’s purpose is, presumably, to heal Durpleton’s childhood trauma.
 Hale also voices Tony Durpleton, Durpleton's father.
 Carl Faruolo as Gebbrey, a paranoid and emotionally fragile ficus-taur on two legs. He is in constant search of his missing coat, as without it he suffers from extreme cold. In the series finale, it’s revealed that Glendale has had possession of his coat for the entire show, and even has worn it at times. Upon regaining his coat, Gebbery lights on fire due to it, ironically, being too hot.
 Faruolo also voices Barnus (a barnacle with a loud voice), a message bird, a worker man, and Henchman 1.
 Lea Salonga as the Mysterious Woman, a human roaming Centaurworld with magical abilities and a history with the Nowhere King and the General. In Season 2, it’s revealed she has been living with the Beartaur. She appears to be antagonistic towards Horse and the herd, but it’s revealed she just doesn’t want other people to experience the tragedies she witnessed. In Season 2, her past with the Nowhere King is fleshes out considerably. She was originally a princess or some form of loyal who developed a relationship with the Elktaur (the former form of the Nowhere King), but the Elktaur had a mental breakdown upon seeing her dancing with another man and became desperate to please her. He ended up splitting his body into two separate forms, the Elk and the General, and when the Woman showed more affection towards the General, his fragile psyche became fragmented once more and he gradually became the Nowhere King. Upon winning the battle against the Nowhere King in the series finale, she restores him to his prior form as the Elktaur and stabs him, killing him and ending her guilt.
 First Aid Kit as The Tree Shamans, a pair of wish-granting tree-like centaurs who are two of Centaurworld's shamans. They grant the herd not specifically what they want, but what they need, and as such they turn Ched into a horse, make Durpleton’s flatulence speak, and help Horse gain backstory magic. Upon realizing how they unfairly treated Wammawink in her past when she tried to resurrect her former herd, Horse and Ched destroy the two shamans, who gradually rebuild themselves over time but are still wary about the two.
 Flula Borg as Comfortable Doug, a mole-like centaur. He normally does not help the herd and is submissive and often flat-out resents them, much to their displeasure. He often talks in a monotone and is quite submissive. However, he proves vital to both Waterbaby and the herd in the Season 2, the former of which he helps by acting as a spy to gain info about the Nowhere King’s plans, and the latter of which he helps in the final showdown by assuming a separate personality named Flat Dallas and gaining the help of the tiny versions of the herd shot out of their hooves.
 Borg also voices a message bird in "The Ballad of Becky Apples".
 Paul F. Tompkins as Horse's tail. After Horse was affected by the magic of Centaurworld, it developed sentience and a penchant for wisecracking. He gradually starts to lessen in his appearances, reappearing once in the series finale when he is briefly resurrected by Horse’s flatulence.
 Tompkins also voices a human in a flashback with Tail's voice, a Yaktaur and one of the Trashtaurs, the rock music-loving Centaurs created by pollution.
 Santigold as Judge Jacket, a star-nosed mole-like centaur and leader of the mole centaurs. She is one of the shamans in Centaurworld.
 David Johansen as Beartaur, who lives in a cave and makes/collects figurines and dioramas of past battles.
 Fred Armisen as Splendib, a tiger-like centaur.
 Armisen's other roles include a cataur named Bimbam, The Duchess Malangella's psychotic grandson Malandrew, and a message bird in three episodes.
 Adewale Akinnuoye-Agbaje as Johnny Teatime, a kitten-like centaur, one of Centaurworld's shamans.
 Akinnuoye-Agbaje also voices Zork Presto.
 Jamie Cullum as Sunfish Merguy, a sunfish-like centaur, also called a merman, who runs a boardwalk amusement park.
 Rosalie Craig as the Whaletaur Shaman, the last shaman of Centaurworld.
 Brian Stokes Mitchell as the Nowhere King, an evil, sadistic, and monstrous creature that created the minotaurs to wage war upon the human world and Centaurworld. Mitchell also voices the Elktaur, a young and idealistic rift technician with an interest in the human world who was motivated by his love for the Mysterious Woman to divide himself into two beings, one being the Nowhere King's original form known as Elk.
 Brian d'Arcy James as The General, the commander of the human forces who is later revealed in the finale to the Elktaur's human side who caused the events that result in his other half becoming the Nowhere King.
 Dee Bradley Baker as Phillip J. "Stabby" Bonecrunch, a lizard-like monster from the human world.
 Baker's other roles include the Muskoxtaur (Kwhass-ón), the puffintaurs, wormtaurs, a gophertaur, some minotaurs, and Baydenbeast.
 Maria Bamford as The Duchess Malangella, a traditional centaur aristocrat.
 Bamford also voices the Duchess' Maître d', and the Opossumtaur.
 Colleen Ballinger as Crandy, a birdtaur influencer
 Ballinger also voices a message bird and the basket woman.
 Scott Hoying as Mouthpiece, a pelican birdtaur who is a devoted fan.
 Grey Griffin as Old Man, another birdtaur fan.
 Griffin also voices Bayden, Hanglydangly, and the lone survivor in "The Ballad of Becky Apples".
 Donna Lynne Champlin as the Prairiedogtaur.
 Wendie Malick as Gurple Durpleton, Durpleton's mother
 Fred Tatasciore as Badgertaur
 Dominic Bisignano as "Figure 1", a young human male that tries to steal some apples from Rider. Bisignano also sings as Sunfish Merguy on the soundtrack album.
 A number of different background singers with semi-prominent choir roles:
 Toby Chu, who also sings for the Rutabagataurs, and the keytaur.
 Randy Crenshaw
 Allie Feder
 Fletcher Sheridan
 Baraka May
 Sarah Mann
 Eric Peterson

Production
The series was first announced in September 2019.

Episodes

Series overview

Season 1 (2021)

Season 2 (2021)

Music

Season 1

Note: The song "Everyday", from the episode "Johnny Teatime's Be Best Competition: A Quest for the Sash", does not appear on the album.

Season 2

Release
Centaurworld was released on Netflix on July 30, 2021. A trailer debuted at the virtual Annecy International Animation Film Festival event in June 2021. A trailer and release date for the second season was posted on November 9, 2021.

Reception
The first season of Centaurworld holds a 100% approval rating on Rotten Tomatoes.

Awards and nominations

Notes

References

External links
 
 

2020s American animated television series
2020s American musical comedy television series
2021 American television series debuts
2021 American television series endings
American animated comedy television series
American animated drama television series
American animated fantasy television series
American animated musical television series
Animated television series about animals
English-language Netflix original programming
Television series by Netflix Animation
2020s American LGBT-related animated television series
Children's and Family Emmy Award winners